Pippa Goldschmidt is a British fiction writer, formerly based in Edinburgh, Scotland but now living in Germany.

Education 
Goldschmidt has a background in science, having completed an undergraduate degree in physics with astronomy at the University of Leeds and a PhD in Astronomy at University of Edinburgh.

Career
After completing her education she worked as a postdoctoral researcher at Queen Mary University and Imperial College in London, then joined the civil service fast stream graduate scheme, working at British National Space Centre and Department for Trade and Industry. During her work in government she worked on homelessness policy for the Scottish Government, as well as offshore renewable energy policy for Marine Scotland.

Writing 
Goldschmidt's debut novel Falling Sky was published in 2013 and a collection of short stories The Need for Better Regulation of Outer Space in 2015. In 2015 she was the co-editor of I Am Because You Are, a collection of short stories on the theme of relativity, published for the centenary of Einstein's theory of general relativity.  She has also been a writer in residence for the ESRC Genomics Policy and Research Forum, the School of Physics and Astronomy at the University of Edinburgh, Wigtown Book Festival, the German city of Heidelberg and is currently writer in residence at the University of Edinburgh's science, technology and innovation studies unit.

In 2008 she achieved an MLitt in Creative Writing from the University of Glasgow.

Publications 

The Falling Sky (2013)
The Need for Better Regulation of Outer Space (2015)
I Am Because You Are (2015)

Awards and honours 

The Falling Sky Shortlisted for Dundee International Book Prize (2012) 
Scottish Book Trust New Writers Award (2012) 
Suffrage Science award (2016) 
 Longlisted for the Edge Hill Short Story Prize (2016)
 Longlisted for the Frank O'Connor International Short Story Award (2015)

References 

British women short story writers
Alumni of the University of Edinburgh
Alumni of the University of Leeds
21st-century British novelists
21st-century British poets
British women poets
British women novelists
Living people
Year of birth missing (living people)
Place of birth missing (living people)
Alumni of the University of Glasgow
21st-century British women writers